The 2022–23 Panathinaikos season is the club's 64th consecutive season in Super League Greece. They also compete in the Greek Cup and the UEFA Europa Conference League.

Players

Current squad

Transfers

Summer window

In

Out

Winter window

In

Out

Pre-season and friendlies

Competitions

Super League Greece

League table

Regular season

Play-off round

Greek Football Cup

Round of 16

Quarter-finals

UEFA Europa Conference League

Third qualifying round

References

External links
 Panathinaikos FC official website

Panathinaikos
Panathinaikos F.C. seasons